Chris Duarte (born February 16, 1963) is an American guitarist, singer, and songwriter. Duarte plays a style of Texas blues-rock that draws on elements of jazz, blues, and rock and roll. In his own words, his musical style is a combination of "rockin' blues" and "punk blues." He is signed to Shrapnel Records.

Biography
Duarte was born in San Antonio, Texas, and was first inspired by music at age eight after seeing Fiddler On The Roof on television. Duarte first began playing on his brother's guitar and then obtained his own electric guitar, a Supro, at the age of 14. In 1979, Duarte moved to Austin, Texas, and purchased a 1963 Fender Stratocaster guitar for $500 and began exploring various genres including the jazz music of John Coltrane and Miles Davis. This guitar he primarily used to learn to play, was stolen in 1993. Duarte was inspired by blues legend Stevie Ray Vaughan, and credits John Coltrane as his number-one musical idol.

Duarte won a label recording contract with Silvertone Records and released Texas Sugar/Strat Magik in 1994, and was named "Best New Talent" in Guitar Player'''s 1995 Reader's Poll. He finished fourth in the magazine's "Best Blues Guitarist" category behind Eric Clapton, Buddy Guy and B.B. King.

Duarte said once in an interview, "I always thought I was a better live performer anyway." Though Duarte has played a limited number of US dates in recent years with the Japanese band Bluestone Company backing him, he performs primarily as a power trio billed as the Chris Duarte Group. Originally formed with long-time friends and collaborators, John Jordan on bass and Jeff Hodges on drums, the current incarnation features Dustin Sargent on bass and John McKnight on drums.

Apart from his band, Duarte has performed with Julie Burrell, Diana Cantu, Bobby Mack, Tracy Conover, Indigenous, and Omar & the Howlers.

Duarte's concert dates in Asheville, North Carolina; Charlotte, North Carolina; and Greenville, South Carolina; were filmed for the PBS television show, The PBS Project, and featured Steve Bailey on bass and Jeff Sipe on drums.

His thirteenth and latest album, Lucky 13, is billed as a Chris Duarte Group release, featuring Dustin Sargent on the bass, and John McKnight on the drums, while Duarte plays the guitar and provides vocals. Following its release in 2014, it received positive reviews for its blend of slow, loping blues with psychedelic, rock and jazz overtones.

Select discography
Albums
1987: Chris Duarte & The Bad Boys (SRS)
1994: Texas Sugar/Strat Magik (Silvertone)
1997: Tailspin Headwhack (Silvertone)
2000: Love Is Greater Than Me (Zoë/Rounder)
2003: Romp (Zoë/Rounder)
2007: Blue Velocity (Blues Bureau International)
2008: Vantage Point (Blues Bureau International)
2009: Chris Duarte & Bluestone Co. (Blues Bureau International)
2009: Something Old, Something New, Something Borrowed, All Things Blue (Blues Bureau International)
2010: Infinite Energy (Janblues)
2011: Blues In The Afterburner (Shrapnel)
2013: My Soul Alone (Shrapnel)
2013: Live (Blues Bureau International)
2014: Lucky 13 (Shrapnel)
2016: The Fan Club (World Domination)

Other appearances
1985: Bobby Mack & Night Train - Night Train (SJM)

Instructional DVDs
1995: The Total Guitar CD Volume 6 - Total Guitar
2006: Axplorations'' - Hal Leonard Corporation

References

External links
Chris Duarte Official Site
Chris Duarte's Electronic Press Kit (duarte.rocks)
Chris Duarte Group Fans
Shrapnel Records Official Site

Chris Duarte early years
Chris Duarte Group fan forum
Chris Duarte interview with A1 Blues
Chris Duarte collection at the Internet Archive's live music archive

1963 births
Living people
American blues guitarists
American male guitarists
Musicians from San Antonio
Texas blues musicians
Songwriters from Texas
American blues singers
American male singers
Guitarists from Texas
20th-century American guitarists
20th-century American male musicians
American male songwriters
Provogue Records artists